This is a list of universities in Montserrat.

Universities 
 Montserrat Community College
 University of Science, Arts and Technology
 University of the West Indies - Montserrat campus

See also 
 List of universities by country

References

Universities
Montserrat
Montserrat
Universities